Svetozar Kika Popović (6 February 1902 – 26 October 1985) was a Yugoslavia and Romania national football player and coach.

Biography
He began his playing career while being a refugee in Rome, Italy, while the Kingdom of Serbia was fighting World War I. At the end of the war, he returned to Serbia and played with BSK Belgrade until 1925. Then, as an employee of the Commercial Bank Italia, he moved to Bucharest, Romania. While still a bank employee, he continued to play football by playing with Juventus Bucharest and Venus Bucharest. On 1 May 1925, he played one match for the Romania national team as Svetozar Popovici, against Turkey.

After retiring, he became a coach. He coached BSK Belgrade in their 1940 Mitropa Cup campaign. He coached on three occasions the Kingdom of Yugoslavia national football team between 1937 and 1941. He was technical director of BSK Belgrade and later worked in the direction of Red Star Belgrade, where he was one of the founders of the club.

Honours
BSK Belgrade
Serbian Championship: 1919–20, 1920–21

Venus București
Romanian Championship: 1928–29

References

1902 births
1985 deaths
Sportspeople from Kragujevac
Serbian footballers
Yugoslav footballers
Yugoslav expatriate footballers
Expatriate footballers in Italy
Yugoslav expatriate sportspeople in Italy
Romanian footballers
Romania international footballers
OFK Beograd players
FC Petrolul Ploiești players
Venus București players
Association football defenders
OFK Beograd managers
Serbian football managers
Yugoslav football managers
Red Star Belgrade non-playing staff